Barbosa (sometimes Barbossa) is a Portuguese and later also Southern Galician surname. It may refer to: 

Adoniran Barbosa (a.k.a. João Rubinato, 1910-1982), Brazilian singer and composer
Agostinho Barbosa (1589–1649), Portuguese writer on canon law
Alexandrina Barbosa (born 1986), Portuguese professional handball player
Almir Barbosa (born 1980), Cape Verdean professional footballer
Anderson Barbosa (born 1974), Brazilian professional footballer
Anggisu Barbosa (born 1993), Indonesian professional footballer
António Barbosa (born 1931), Portuguese footballer
Arthur Barbosa (1908-1995), British illustrator
Bárbara Micheline do Monte Barbosa, Brazilian soccer player/goalkeeper
Bruno da Silva Barbosa (born 1988), Brazilian professional footballer
Cândido Barbosa (born 1974), Portuguese professional race car driver
Cédric Barbosa (born 1976), French professional footballer
César Barbosa (born 1954), Colombian biologist
Chris Barbosa (born ?), American music producer
Daniel Camargo Barbosa (1930–1994), prolific Colombian serial killer and rapist
Dario Barbosa (1882–1965), Brazilian Olympic sport shooter
Domingos Caldas Barbosa (c. 1739–1800), Brazilian poet and musician
Duarte Barbosa (c. late 15th century–1521), Portuguese writer and explorer
Euclydes Barbosa (a.k.a. Jaú, 1909–1988), Brazilian professional footballer
Everaldo Barbosa (born 1975), Brazilian professional footballer
Frederico Barbosa (born 1961), Brazilian poet
Givaldo Barbosa (born 1954), Brazilian professional tennis player
Hélder Barbosa (born 1987), Portuguese professional footballer
Henrique Barbosa (born 1984), Brazilian Olympic swimmer
Jade Barbosa (born 1991), Brazilian Olympic gymnast
João Barbosa (born 1975), Portuguese professional race car driver
João Tamagnini Barbosa (1883–1948), Portuguese army brigadier and politician
Joaquim Barbosa (born 1953), Brazilian justice minister
Jorge Barbosa (1902–1971), Cape Verdean poet and writer
José Barbosa (born 1929), Puerto Rican Olympic pole vaulter
José Celso Barbosa (1857–1921), Puerto Rican physician, sociologist, and politician
José Luíz Barbosa (a.k.a. Zequinha Barbosa, born 1961), Brazilian Olympic athlete
José Vicente Barbosa du Bocage (1823–1907), Portuguese zoologist and politician
Leandro Barbosa (born 1982), Brazilian professional basketball player
Luciano Barbosa (born 1976), Brazilian professional squash player
Luis Barbosa (born 1953), Colombian Olympic runner
Lula Barbosa (born 1970), Brazilian professional beach volleyball player
Madalena Barbosa
Manuel Maria Barbosa du Bocage (1765–1805), Portuguese poet
Marcelo Barbosa (born 1975), Brazilian guitar player and music professor
Marcia Barbosa, Brazilian physicist
Mariano Barbosa (born 1984), Argentine professional footballer
Moacir Barbosa Nascimento (1921–2000), Brazilian professional footballer (goalkeeper)
Octávio Barbosa (1907–1997), Brazilian geologist
Pablo Barbosa (1815–c. 1900), Mexican benefactor, farmer, cattle rancher, and landowner
Palmira Barbosa (born 1961), Angolan Olympic athlete
Pedro Barbosa (born 1970), Portuguese professional footballer
Pedro Barbosa (jurist) (1530/35–1606), Portuguese jurist
Pilar Barbosa (de Rosario) (1898–1997), Puerto Rican educator, historian and political activist
Roberto Firmino Barbosa de Oliveira (born 1991), Brazilian footballer
Rodrigo Barbosa (born 1988), Brazilian professional race car driver
Rui Barbosa (a.k.a. Ruy Barbosa, 1849–1923), Brazilian writer, jurist, and politician
Timotea Barbosa (a.k.a. Doña Timo, 1860–1930), Mexican benefactor
Vera Barbosa (born 1989), Portuguese Olympic track and field athlete
William da Silva Barbosa (born 1978), Brazilian professional footballer
Willian Xavier Barbosa (born 1983), Brazilian professional footballer

In fiction
Hector Barbossa, a fictional character from Pirates of the Caribbean

See also
 Barboza
 Barbarossa (disambiguation)

References 

Portuguese-language surnames
Galician-language surnames